Twin City Twisters, commonly shortened to TCT, is an artistic gymnastics facility located in Champlin, Minnesota. It has produced a number of elite gymnasts, collegiate gymnasts and Junior Olympics national qualifiers. Some of its most notable members are Maggie Nichols, Grace McCallum, Jessie DeZiel, Abby Paulson, and Breanna Hughes.

History 
Mike Hunger, a Utah State University graduate, opened the facility in September 1987.

Coaching staff 
 Mike Hunger - Owner and Head coach - Minnesota Golden Gophers men's gymnastics team member
 Sami Wozney 
 Sarah Jantzi 
 Rich Stenger - Minnesota Golden Gophers assistant coach, former Roseville High School assistant coach

Notable alumni 
The following gymnasts have come out of TCT's program:

Jessie DeZiel
 U.S. National Team (2011)
 2011 Pan American Games team champion
 Nebraska Cornhuskers gymnastics

Grace McCallum
 2020 Olympic team silver medalist
 U.S. National Team (2018–22)
 2018 World team champion
 2019 World team champion
 2018 Pacific Rim team and all-around champion, vault and floor exercise silver medalist
 2018 Pan American team, all-around, and uneven bars champion, vault and balance beam bronze medalist
 2022 NCAA team bronze medalist
 Utah Red Rocks gymnastics (2022–25)

Maggie Nichols
 U.S. National Team (2013–2016)
 2015 World team champion, floor exercise bronze medalist
 2017 NCAA team and uneven bars champion
 2018 NCAA all-around, uneven bars, and floor exercise champion, team and balance beam silver medalist
 2019 NCAA team, all-around, and vault champion, uneven bars silver medalist
 Oklahoma Sooners gymnastics (2017–20)

Lexi Zeiss
 U.S. National Team (2022–present)
 2022 World team champion (alternate)
 2022 Pan American team and all-around silver medalist, balance beam bronze medalist

References 

Sports teams in Minnesota
Companies based in Champlin, Minnesota
Gymnastics organizations
Gymnastics clubs
Gymnastics clubs in the United States
Gymnastics academies in the United States